Superstitious beliefs or practices in Turkey have been considered as a part of Turkish culture and are often noticed in everyday life.

Evil eye

The amulet called nazar is supposed to protect against the "evil eye", a superstition shared among several cultures.

Knocking on wood
"Knocking on wood" is believed to protect from all evils.

Lead pouring

There is an old tradition of molybdomancy called "kurşun dökme" in Turkish (literally, "lead casting", "lead pouring") which is supposed to help with various spiritual problems, e.g. to combat the effects of the evil eye., to predict future, etc.   The rituals vary, but they involve pouring molten lead into water. This tradition is known in other cultures around the world.  Researchers from Ankara University performed a study of the effects of this tradition on the health of women. They reported risks of antimony poisoning and lead poisoning.

Broken mirror

As well as in many different cultures, Turkish people believe that breaking a mirror brings bad luck and seven years of unhappiness.

Forty times repeating
Turkish people believe that repeating something forty times can make the thing happen.

Right hand and left hand
People in Turkey also believe that itching of the right hand means unexpected money inflow in close future. Likewise, itching of left hand means possible loss of money.

Slippers
Inside a house, if slippers are upside down, it means that somebody will die at home.

Black cat
If people in Turkey see a black cat, they immediately need to hold something black. Otherwise it can bring bad luck.

See also 

 Superstitions in Muslim societies

References

Turkey
Turkey
Turkish culture